The Aristocraft II was a six-place homebuilt aircraft designed by Terrence O'Neill.

Design and development
The Aristocraft II was a redesigned aircraft built off the prototype airframe of the WACO Aristocraft. The Franklin-powered Aristocraft pusher was rebuilt using the wings and most of the internal structure of the original. The layout was drastically changed from a twin-tailed, mid-engined, pusher to a conventional tractor arrangement. The intent was to develop a homebuilt aircraft from the design with the flexibility to carry six passengers, or fewer people with extended range. An effort was made to certify the design, under the name Model W Winner but money ran out before completion, with only two orders.

The Aristocraft II was a strut-braced, high-wing, tricycle gear, six-passenger aircraft designed for Franklin or Lycoming  engines.  The fuselage was made of welded steel tubing with aluminum skin. The cowling was split vertically, and could hinge open for maintenance.

Variants
The standard engine was a six-cylinder Lycoming, however plans were drawn for a 
Jacobs L-4MB radial engine installation and also for a Continental R-670 radial installation. This specified that the engine would be mounted closer to the firewall and also incorporated conventional landing gear, a  propeller and the outward appearance of "Mr. Muligan", this evolved into the O'Neill Magnum.

Specifications (Arisocraft II)

See also

References

Homebuilt aircraft